The following is a list of notable deaths in November 2005.

Entries for each day are listed alphabetically by surname. A typical entry lists information in the following sequence:
 Name, age, country of citizenship at birth, subsequent country of citizenship (if applicable), reason for notability, cause of death (if known), and reference.

November 2005

1
Mary Bennett, 92, British academic.
Richard Greenwell, 63, British cryptozoologist.
Skitch Henderson, 87, American pianist, conductor, composer and bandleader (The Tonight Show).
V. K. Madhavan Kutty, 71, Indian journalist and author.
William C. Marshall, 87, British thoroughbred horse racing trainer.
Desmond Piers, 92, Canadian naval rear admiral.
Michael Piller, 57, American writer and producer (Star Trek, The Dead Zone, Simon & Simon), cancer.
Joseph C. Rodriguez, 76, American soldier and Medal of Honor recipient for actions in Korean War, possible heart attack.
Gladys Tantaquidgeon, 106, American Mohegan tribal matriarch.
Michael Thwaites, 90, Australian poet, writer, naval officer, intelligence officer involved in the Petrov Affair.

2
Rutherford Aris, 76, American chemical engineer and academic. Parkinson's disease.
Jean Carson, 80, American actress, (The Andy Griffith Show).
John Mieremet, 44, Dutch organized crime leader, shot.
Rick Rhodes, 54, American film composer and music supervisor, winner of six Emmy Awards, brain cancer.
Ferruccio Valcareggi, 86, Italian football player and manager (national team).

3
Kent Andersson, 71, Swedish actor, playwright and theatre director.
Hrvoje Bartolović, 73, Croatian chess problemist.
Aenne Burda, 96, German publisher.
Talmadge Davis, 43, American Cherokee artist, heart attack.
Hans Raj Dogra, 74, Indian politician.
C. P. Ellis, 78, American former Ku Klux Klan member turned civil rights activist.
R.C. Gorman, 74, American internationally exhibited Navajo artist, blood infection and pneumonia.
Serge Karlow, 84, American former CIA officer wrongly suspected of treason, pneumonia.
Geoffrey Keen, 89, British actor of American films (Minister Frederick Gray in the James Bond films), natural causes.
Otto Lacis, 71, Russian journalist.
Paul Roazen, 69, American professor and historian of psychoanalysis, complications of Crohn's disease.
Melvin White, 55, American convicted murderer, executed in Texas.

4
Nick Adduci, 76, American football player.
Nadia Anjuman, 25, Afghan poet.
Michael G. Coney, 73, Canadian science fiction author, mesothelioma.
Milt Holland, 88, American percussionist.
Earl Krugel, 62, American JDL activist and convicted criminal, prison assault.
Sheree North, 72, American actress, complications following surgery.
Graham Payn, 87, South African actor, singer and partner of Sir Noël Coward.
Brian Steckel, 36, American convicted murderer, executed in Delaware.
Hiro Takahashi, 41, Japanese singer, multiple organ dysfunction syndrome, tumor.
Hastings Wise, 51, American convicted murderer, executed in South Carolina.

5
Peter Brunt, 88, British ancient historian.
Hugh Alexander Dunn, 82, Australian diplomat, ambassador to Taiwan (1969–1972) and China (1980–1984).
John Fowles, 79, British author, after a long illness.
Derek Lamb, 69, British animator, Oscar-winning producer.
Link Wray, 76, American rock and roll guitarist, best known for the 1958 instrumental "Rumble".

6
Robert Alexander, Baron Alexander of Weedon, 69, British peer, barrister, banker, politician and President of the MCC, stroke.
Ignacio Burgoa, 87, Mexican lawyer.
Rod Donald, 48, New Zealand politician, co-leader of the Green Party of Aotearoa New Zealand, viral myocarditis.
Minako Honda, 38, Japanese pop singer, myelogenous leukemia.
Dick Hutcherson, 73, American former NASCAR driver, heart attack.
Theodore Puck, 89, American researcher of genetics, complications from a broken hip.
Anthony Sawoniuk, 84, Polish-born Nazi criminal, dead in a United Kingdom prison, natural causes.

7
Milly Bernard, 85, American politician, member of the Utah House of Representatives.
Vicente Carattini, 65, Puerto Rican singer and composer.
Fraise, 17, American thoroughbred racehorse.
Mikhail Gasparov, 70, Russian literary theorist.
Nobuhiko Hasegawa, 58, Japanese table tennis player.
Harry Thompson, 45, British producer and writer of TV comedies, biographer and novelist, lung cancer.
Donald Watson, 87, British wildlife artist.
Steve Whatley, 46, British theatre actor, consumer expert, journalist and television presenter, suicide.
Robert Woof, 74, English scholar.

8
Alekos Alexandrakis, 77, Greek actor, cancer.
George Brumwell, 66, British trade unionist.
Robert Eugene Bush, 79, American U.S. Navy hospital corpsman, youngest sailor awarded a Medal of Honor in World War II, kidney failure.
Francis Cheetham, 77, British museum director and authority on alabaster.
Carola Höhn, 95, German stage and cinema actress.
Beland Honderich, 86, Canadian newspaper executive, former publisher of Toronto Star, stroke.
Charlie Smith, 49, British poet and politician.
David Westheimer, 88, American author, novelist (Von Ryan's Express).
Adel al-Zubeidi, Iraqi attorney in the continuing Trial of Saddam Hussein, bullet wounds sustained in Baghdad.

9
Avril Angers, 87, British comedian and actress, pneumonia.
Azahari Husin, 48, Malaysian technical mastermind of the 2002 and 2005 Bali bombings.
Muriel Degauque, 38, Belgian waitress who converted to Islam, and became the West's first woman suicide bomber.
Stephen McGill, 93, Scottish Anglican prelate, Bishop of Paisley (1968–1988).
K. R. Narayanan, 85, Indian politician, President of India (1997–2002), pneumonia and renal failure.
Wilhelm Walcher, 95, German physicist.
Charles R. Weiner, 83, U.S. federal judge who crafted the mass settlement of asbestos lawsuits, kidney failure.

10
Fernando Bujones, 50, American classical ballet dancer, melanoma.
Steve Courson, 50, American football player, former Pittsburgh Steelers offensive guard, gardening accident.
Ernest Crichlow, 91, African-American artist of the Harlem Renaissance, heart failure.
Kristian Fredrikson, 65, New Zealand-born Australian stage and costume designer, lung failure.
John Ling, 72, British diplomat and politician.
Gardner Read, 92, American composer.
Bruce Sarver, 43, American NHRA race car driver, suicide.
Ted Wragg, 67, British professor of education and commentator on education topics, heart attack.

11
Moustapha Akkad, 75, Syrian-born American film producer (Halloween films), injuries sustained in Jordanian bombings.
Keith Andes, 85, American film actor (Tora! Tora! Tora!), suicide by asphyxiation.
Peter Drucker, 95, Austrian-born American management theorist, natural causes.
Pamela Duncan, 73, American B-movie and TV actress.
Desmond Henley, 78, British embalmer.
Patrick Anson, 5th Earl of Lichfield, 66, British peer and photographer, stroke.
Steven Van McHone, 35, American convicted murderer, executed in North Carolina.
Murugappa Channaveerappa Modi, 89, Indian ophthalmologist.
Eduardo Rabossi, 75, Argentine philosopher and human rights activist.

12
Arthur K. Cebrowski, 63, American retired U.S. Navy vice admiral and Pentagon official, cancer.
Madhu Dandavate, 81, Indian socialist leader.
James Fyfe, 63, American criminologist and instructor, cancer.
Roger Groot, 63, American law professor, also known for defending Lee Boyd Malvo.

13
William B. Bryant, 94, American senior U.S. federal judge and the first black federal prosecutor in U.S. history.
Florence Bucior, 85, American All-American Girls Professional Baseball League player.
Vine Deloria, Jr., 72, Native American author and activist, aortic aneurysm.
Eddie Guerrero, 38, Mexican-American WWE professional wrestler, heart failure.
Harry Gold, 98, Irish jazz-musician.
Charles Owen Rice, 96, American Roman Catholic priest and labor activist.
Miriam Roth, 95, Israeli writer and educator.
Ruth M. Siems, 74, American home economist, an inventor of Stove Top stuffing.
Eddie Stapleton, 74, Australian rugby union player.
Paul L. Ward, 94, American historian, past president of the American Historical Association and Sarah Lawrence College.

14
John Campo Sr., 67, American champion horse trainer.
Miriam Hodgson, 66, British editor of children's books, ovarian cancer.
Ahmed Mamsa, 86, Indian cricket umpire.
Robert D. Nesen, 87, American car dealer and diplomat.
Erich Schanko, 86, German international footballer.
Jenő Takács, 103, Hungarian classical composer and pianist.

15
Gustav Aarestrup, 89, Norwegian businessman.
Felipe de Alba, 81, Mexican actor.
Barry K. Atkins, 94, U.S. Navy admiral, decorated World War II veteran.
Roy Brooks, 67, American jazz drummer.
Agenore Incrocci, aka Age, 86, Italian screenwriter.
Adrian Rogers, 74, American religious leader, complications of colon cancer.
Robert Rowell, 50, American convicted murderer, execution by lethal injection.
Agapito Sanchez, 35, Dominican former junior featherweight boxing champion, gunshot wounds.
Louis Sévèke, 41, Dutch left wing political activist, shot.
Robert Tisch, 79, American businessman, co-owner of the NFL's New York Giants, brain cancer.
Osmond Watson, 71, Jamaican painter and sculptor.

16
Dante Benedetti, 86, American restaurateur and baseball coach.
Sandy Consuegra, 85, Cuban baseball pitcher.
Ralph Edwards, 92, American television host and producer, heart failure.
John Marlyn, 93, Canadian author.
Paul Noel, 81, American basketball player.
Henry Taube, 89, Canadian-born 1983 Nobel Laureate in Chemistry.
Shannon Charles Thomas, 34, American convicted murderer, executed in Texas.
Donald Watson, 95, British founder of the Vegan Society, natural causes.

17
Elizabeth Ann Blaesing, 86, American alleged illegitimate daughter of Warren G. Harding.
Walter Muehlbronner, 83, American figure skater.
Marek Perepeczko, 63, Polish actor.
Sybil Shearer, 93, American modern dance choreographer.

18
Armen Abaghian, 72, Russian nuclear scientist.
Alfonso Arana, 78, Puerto Rican painter.
Sharon Beshenivsky, 38, British Woman Police Constable, murdered in line of duty.
Sandy Blythe, 43, Australian wheelchair basketball player.
Harold J. Stone, 92, American actor (Welcome Back, Kotter, Somebody Up There Likes Me).
Elias Syriani, 67, Jordanian-born American convicted murderer, executed in North Carolina.
Lee Yoon-hyung, 26, South Korean millionaire, heiress of Samsung, suicide.

19
Artine Artinian, 97, French literary scholar.
David Austin, 70, British cartoonist (The Guardian).
Erik Balling, 80, Danish TV and film director.
Steve Belichick, 86, American football player and coach.
John Timpson, 77, British journalist, ex-presenter of the Today programme on BBC Radio 4, natural causes.

20
Moses Adasu, 60, Nigerian politician.
Manouchehr Atashi, 74, Iranian poet.
Canute Caliste, 91, Grenadian painter.
Nora Denney, 77, American actress, illness.
Jonathan James-Moore, 59, English theatre manager, former BBC Radio head of light entertainment, cancer.
James King, 80, American operatic tenor.
Harry Lawton, 77, American writer.
Glenn Mitchell, 55, American public radio broadcaster, radio talk show host.
Lou Myers, 90, American cartoonist (The New Yorker).
Chris Whitley, 45, American musician, lung cancer.
Ronald Duterte, 71, Filipino politician and lawyer, former Mayor of Cebu City

21
Alfred Anderson, 109, Scottish World War I veteran, oldest living man in Scotland and last survivor of the 1914 Christmas truce.
Albert H. Bosch, 97, American politician, Republican United States Representative from New York (1953–1960).
Sonny Hutchins, 76, American retired stock car and NASCAR driver.
John W. Mitchell, 88, British sound engineer.
Mary Ann Aspinwall Owens, 77, American philatelist.
Hugh Sidey, 78, American journalist, Time magazine.
Umrao Singh, 85, Indian non-commissioned officer, last surviving Indian recipient of the Victoria Cross.

22
David Ashton, 78, Australian botanist and ecologist.
Madani Bouhouche, 53, Belgian gendarme and criminal.
Glenn W. Burton, 95, American agricultural scientist.
Frank Gatski, 83, American football player (Cleveland Browns) and member of the Pro Football Hall of Fame, heart disease.
Bruce Hobbs, 84, British jockey and race horse trainer.
Joseph J. Thorndike, 92, American editor and writer.

23
Ingvil Aarbakke, 35, Norwegian artist, cancer.
Mike Austin, 95, American golfer.
George Bogart, 72, American painter.
Isabel de Castro, 74, Portuguese actress, cancer.
Constance Cummings, 95, American-born British actress.
Nate Hawthorne, 55, American pro basketball player, heart attack.

24
Jamuna Baruah, 86, Indian actress.
Ralph Braibanti, 85, American political scientist.
Pat Morita, 73, American actor (The Karate Kid, Happy Days, Mulan), kidney failure.
John M. Vlissides, 44, American software scientist, one of the "Gang of Four", co-author of the book Design Patterns: Elements of Reusable Object-Oriented Software, complications of a brain tumor.

25
Andria Apakidze, 91, Georgian archaeologist and historian.
George Best, 59, Northern Irish football player (Manchester United, Northern Ireland), multiple organ failure.
Hans Karl Burgeff, 77, German sculptor.
Richard Burns, 34, British rally driver (2001 World Rally Championship champion), astrocytoma brain tumour.
Polina Gelman, 86, Soviet air force officer.
Pierre Seel, 82, French Holocaust survivor.

26
Takanori Arisawa, 54, Japanese composer.
Stan Berenstain, 82, American writer and illustrator, Berenstain Bears co-creator, complications due to cancer.
Clive Bradley, 69, Trinidadian steel pan musician.
Colin Brinded, 59, British snooker referee, cancer.
Gopal Godse, 86, Indian last surviving conspirator in the assassination of Mahatma Gandhi.
Charles "Clare" Laking, 106, Canadian soldier, one of the last surviving Canadian World War I veterans.
David Tabor, 92, British physicist.

27
Jocelyn Brando, 86, American actress.
Noboru Iwamura, 78, Japanese medical scientist.
Joe "Boogaloo" Jones, 79, American R&B singer, composer, complications from coronary artery bypass surgery.
Frederick R. McManus, 82, American Roman Catholic priest and academic.
Franz Schönhuber, 82, German politician (Die Republikaner party).
Lys Symonette, 90, American pianist and musical stage performer.

28
Donald V. Bennett, 90, American general, former commandant United States Military Academy.
Jack Concannon, 62, American football player, former NFL quarterback, heart attack.
Marc Lawrence, 95, American film actor (subjected to the Hollywood blacklist in the 1940s/50s), heart failure.
Tony Meehan, 62, British former Shadows drummer, head injuries resulting from domestic accident.
Helen Muir, 85, British rheumatologist.
Eric Nance, 45, American convicted murderer, executed in Arkansas.
E. Cardon "Card" Walker, 89, American corporate head of Walt Disney Productions from 1976–1983, congestive heart failure.

29
Bob Brown, 78, American ethnomusicologist, complications of cancer.
Joseph Furst, 89, Austrian actor.
Józef Garliński, 92, Polish historian and writer.
Ashraf Ghorbal, 80, Egyptian diplomat.
John R. Hicks, 49, American convicted murderer, executed in Ohio.
Uffe Schultz Larsen, 84, Danish Olympic shooter.
Macon McCalman, 72, American actor (Smokey and the Bandit, Falling Down, Doc Hollywood), complications from a series of strokes.
Vic Power, 78, Puerto Rican baseball player (Minnesota Twins) and Gold Glove winning first baseman. One of the first Hispanic players in the Major Leagues, cancer.
Stanley Russell, 99, New Zealand businessman and politician, Mayor of Nelson.
Stepan Senchuk, 50, Ukrainian politician, former governor of Lviv Oblast, homicide by gunshot.
Wendie Jo Sperber, 47, American actress (Back to the Future, Bosom Buddies, Bachelor Party), breast cancer.
David di Tommaso, 26, French soccer player, cardiac arrest.
Deon van der Walt, 47, South African operatic tenor, homicide by gunshot.

30
Roger Behm, 76, Luxembourg boxer.
Donald Breckenridge, 75, American hotel developer, lung cancer.
Svullo, 46, Swedish actor and comedian, suicide.
Lenford "Steve" Harvey, 30, Jamaican AIDS campaigner, murdered.
Viggo Jensen, 84, Danish footballer.
Denis Lindsay, 66, South African cricketer, long illness.
Jean Parker, 90, American film actress (Little Women), natural causes (disease).
Jim Sasseville, 78, American cartoonist (It's Only a Game).
Herbert L. Strock, 87, American B-movie director, heart failure.

References 

2005-11
 11